The Copa de Competencia Británica George VI was an official Argentine football cup competition, played from 1944 to 1948. It was contested by teams participating in Primera División.

The format was a single-elimination tournament and the first editions (1944 and 1945) allowed four semifinalist teams to play the "Copa de la República". The fourth edition was abandoned in the first stage and therefore the Argentine Football Association declared there was not a champion.

The trophy was named after King George VI and donated by the ambassador of the United Kingdom in Argentina.

Champions

Finals

Topscorers 
Source:

References

B